Sabatia campanulata, commonly known as the slender rose gentian or slender marsh-pink, is an herbaceous plant in the gentian family. It is native to the primarily to the southeastern United States.

This species is most abundant in coastal areas. Its natural habitat is open, moist, acidic areas such as bogs, seeps, and pine savannas. Populations extend northward, and become increasingly rare, up the Atlantic Coast to Massachusetts.

It is a perennial that produces pink flowers in the summer.

References 

campanulata
Flora of North America